Denis Zimba (born 7 August 1971) is a Zambian boxer. He competed in the men's lightweight event at the 1996 Summer Olympics.

References

External links
 

1971 births
Living people
Zambian male boxers
Olympic boxers of Zambia
Boxers at the 1996 Summer Olympics
Place of birth missing (living people)
Commonwealth Games medallists in boxing
Commonwealth Games silver medallists for Zambia
Boxers at the 2002 Commonwealth Games
Lightweight boxers
Medallists at the 2002 Commonwealth Games